Hurricane Hutch is a 1921 American adventure film serial directed by George B. Seitz. The film is considered to be lost. The story concerns the search for a lost formula for making paper from seaweed that will save a mortgaged papermill.

Cast
 Charles Hutchison as Larry 'Hutch' Hutchdale
 Lucy Fox as Nancy Kellogg
 Warner Oland as Clifton Marlow
 Diana Deer as Belle Brinkley
 Ann Hastings as Ann Haviland
 Harry Semels as Jim Tiegerley
 Frank Redman as John Brinkley
 Tom Goodwin as Silas Haviland (as Tomas G. Goodwin)
 Charles 'Patch' Revada as Bill Hogan (as Charles Revada)
 Joe Cuny as Wilson Winslow

Chapter titles

 The Secret Cipher
 The Cycle Bullet
 The Millionth Chance
 Smashing Through
 One Against Many
 At the Risk of his Neck
 On a Dangerous Coast
 Double Crossed
 Overboard
 The Show Down
 Hare and Hounds
 Red Courage
 Neck and Neck
 The Secret of the Flame
 The Last Duel

See also
 List of film serials
 List of film serials by studio
 List of lost films

References

Bibliography
Lahue, Kalton C., Continued Next Week: A History of the Moving Picture Serial (University of Oklahoma Press, 1964)

External links

1921 films
1921 lost films
1921 adventure films
American silent serial films
American black-and-white films
American adventure films
Films directed by George B. Seitz
Lost American films
1920s American films
Silent adventure films